The self is an individual as the object of that individual’s own reflective consciousness. Since the self is a reference by a subject to the same subject, this reference is necessarily subjective. The sense of having a self—or selfhood—should, however, not be confused with subjectivity itself. Ostensibly, this sense is directed outward from the subject to refer inward, back to its "self" (or itself). Examples of psychiatric conditions where such "sameness" may become broken include depersonalization, which sometimes occurs in schizophrenia: the self appears different from the subject.

The first-person perspective distinguishes selfhood from personal identity. Whereas "identity" is (literally) sameness and may involve categorization and labeling,
selfhood implies a first-person perspective and suggests potential uniqueness. Conversely, we use "person" as a third-person reference. Personal identity can be impaired in late-stage Alzheimer's disease and in other neurodegenerative diseases. Finally, the self is distinguishable from "others". Including the distinction between sameness and otherness, the self versus other is a research topic in contemporary philosophy and contemporary phenomenology (see also psychological phenomenology), psychology, psychiatry, neurology, and neuroscience.

Although subjective experience is central to selfhood, the privacy of this experience is only one of many problems in the Philosophy of self and scientific study of consciousness.

Psychology

The psychology of self is the study of either the cognitive and affective representation of one's identity or the subject of experience. The earliest formulation of the self in modern psychology forms the distinction between the self as I, the subjective knower, and the self as Me, the subject that is known.  Current views of the self in psychology position the self as playing an integral part in human motivation, cognition, affect, and social identity. Self following from John Locke has been seen as a product of episodic memory but research upon those with amnesia find they have a coherent sense of self based upon preserved conceptual autobiographical knowledge. It is increasingly possible to correlate cognitive and affective experience of self with neural processes.  A goal of this ongoing research is to provide grounding and insight into the elements of which the complex multiple situated selves of human identity are composed.

What the Freudian tradition has subjectively called, "sense of self" is for Jungian analytic psychology, where one's identity is lodged in the persona or ego and is subject to change in maturation. Carl Jung distinguished, "The self is not only the center but also the whole circumference which embraces both conscious and unconscious; it is the center of this totality...". The Self in Jungian psychology is "the archetype of wholeness and the regulating center of the psyche ... a transpersonal power that transcends the ego." As a Jungian archetype, it cannot be seen directly, but by ongoing individuating maturation and analytic observation, can be experienced objectively by its cohesive wholeness-making factor.

Meanwhile, self psychology is a set of psychotherapeutic principles and techniques established by the Austrian-born American psychoanalyst Heinz Kohut upon the foundation of the psychoanalytic method developed by Freud, and is specifically focused on the subjectivity of experience, which, according to self psychology, is mediated by a psychological structure called the self.

Psychiatry

The 'Disorders of the Self' have also been extensively studied by psychiatrists.

For example, facial and pattern recognition take large amounts of brain processing capacity but pareidolia cannot explain many constructs of self for cases of disorder, such as schizophrenia or schizoaffective disorder.
One's sense of self can also be changed upon becoming part of a stigmatized group. According to Cox, Abramson, Devine, and Hollon (2012), if an individual has prejudice against a certain group, like the elderly and then later becomes part of this group this prejudice can be turned inward causing depression (i.e. deprejudice).

The philosophy of a disordered self, such as in schizophrenia, is described in terms of what the psychiatrist understands are actual events in terms of neuron excitation but are delusions nonetheless, and the schizo-affective or a schizophrenic person also believes are actual events in terms of essential being. PET scans have shown that auditory stimulation is processed in certain areas of the brain, and imagined similar events are processed in adjacent areas, but hallucinations are processed in the same areas as actual stimulation. In such cases, external influences may be the source of consciousness and the person may or may not be responsible for "sharing" in the mind's process, or the events which occur, such as visions and auditory stimuli, may persist and be repeated often over hours, days, months or years—and the afflicted person may believe themselves to be in a state of rapture or possession.

Neuroscience

Two areas of the brain that are important in retrieving self-knowledge are the medial prefrontal cortex and the medial posterior parietal cortex.
The posterior cingulate cortex, the anterior cingulate cortex, and medial prefrontal cortex are thought to combine to provide humans with the ability to self-reflect. The insular cortex is also thought to be involved in the process of self-reference.

Sociology
Culture consists of explicit and implicit patterns of historically derived and selected ideas and their embodiment in institutions, cognitive and social practices, and artifacts.  Cultural systems may, on the one hand, be considered as products of action, and on the other, as conditioning elements of further action. The way individuals construct themselves may be different due to their culture.

Markus and Kitayama's early 1990s theory hypothesized that representations of the self in human cultures would fall on a continuum from independent to interdependent. The independent self is supposed to be egoistic, unique, separated from the various contexts, critical in judgment, and prone to self-expression. The interdependent self is supposed to be altruistic, similar with the others, flexible according to contexts, conformist, and unlikely to express opinions that would disturb the harmony of his or her group of belonging. This theory enjoyed huge popularity despite its many problems such as being based on popular stereotypes and myths about different cultures rather than on rigorous scientific research as well as postulating a series of causal links between culture and self-construals without presenting any evidence supporting them.

A large study from 2016 involving a total of 10,203 participants from 55 cultural groups found that there is no independent versus interdependent dimension of self-construal because traits supposed by Markus & Kitayama to form a coherent construct do not actually correlate, or if they correlate, they have correlations opposite to those postulated by Markus & Kitayama. There are seven separate dimensions of self-construal which can be found at both the cultural level of analysis and the individual level of analysis. These dimensions are difference versus similarity (if the individual considers himself or herself to be a unique person or to be the same as everybody else), self-containment versus connection to others (feeling oneself as being separated from others versus feeling oneself as being together with the others), self-direction versus receptiveness to influence (independent thinking versus conformity). Westerners, Latin Americans, and the Japanese are relatively likely to represent their individual self as unique and different from that of others while Arabs, South-East Asians, and Africans are relatively likely to represent themselves as being similar to that of others. Individuals from Uganda, Japan, Colombia, Namibia, Ghana, and Belgium were most likely to represent their selves as being emotionally separated from the community while individuals from Oman, Malaysia, Thailand, and central Brazil were most likely to consider themselves as emotionally connected to their communities. Japanese, Belgians, British, and Americans from Colorado were most likely to value independent thinking and consider themselves as making their own decisions in life independently from others. On the other hand, respondents from rural Peru, Malaysia, Ghana, Oman, and Hungary were most likely to place more value on following others rather than thinking for themselves as well as to describe themselves as being often influenced by others in their decisions. Middle Easterners from Lebanon, Turkey, Egypt, and Oman were most likely to value self-reliance and consider themselves as working on their own and being economically independent of others. On the other hand, respondents from Uganda, Japan, and Namibia were most likely to consider cooperation between different individuals in economical activities as being important. Chileans, Ethiopians from the highlands, Turks, and people from Lebanon placed a relatively high degree of importance on maintaining a stable pattern of behavior regardless of situation or context. Individuals from Japan, Cameroon, the United Kingdom, and Sweden were most likely to describe themselves as being adaptable to various contexts and to place value on this ability. Colombians, Chileans, US Hispanics, Belgians, and Germans were most likely to consider self-expression as being more important than maintaining harmony within a group. Respondents from Oman, Cameroon, and Malaysia were most likely to say that they prefer keeping harmony within a group to engaging in self-expression. Sub-Saharan Africans from Namibia, Ghana, and Uganda considered that they would follow their own interests even if this means harming the interests of those close to them. Europeans from Belgium, Italy, and Sweden had the opposite preference, considering self-sacrifice for other members of the community as being more important than accomplishing selfish goals.

Contrary to the theory of Markus & Kitayama, egoism correlates negatively with individual uniqueness, independent thinking, and self-expression. Self-reliance correlates strongly and negatively with emotional self-containment, which is also unexpected given Markus & Kitayama's theory. The binary classification of cultural self-construals into independent versus interdependent is deeply flawed because in reality, the traits do not correlate according to Markus & Kitayama's self-construal theory, and this theory fails to take into consideration the extremely diverse and complex variety of self-construals present in various cultures across the world.

Philosophy

The philosophy of self seeks to describe essential qualities that constitute a person's uniqueness or essential being. There have been various approaches to defining these qualities. The self can be considered that being which is the source of consciousness, the agent responsible for an individual's thoughts and actions, or the substantial nature of a person which endures and unifies consciousness over time.

In addition to Emmanuel Levinas writings on "otherness", the distinction between "you" and "me" has been further elaborated in Martin Buber's philosophical work: Ich und Du.

Religion

Religious views on the Self vary widely. The Self is a complex and core subject in many forms of spirituality. Two types of Self are commonly considered—the Self that is the ego, also called the learned, superficial Self of mind and body, egoic creation, and the Self which is sometimes called the "True Self", the "Observing Self", or the "Witness". In Hinduism, the Ātman (Self), despite being experienced as an individual, is actually a representation of the unified transcendent reality, Brahman. Our experience of reality doesn't match the nature of Brahman due to māyā.

One description of spirituality is the Self's search for "ultimate meaning" through an independent comprehension of the sacred. Another definition of spiritual identity is: "A persistent sense of Self that addresses ultimate questions about the nature, purpose, and meaning of life, resulting in behaviors that are consonant with the individual’s core values. Spiritual identity appears when the symbolic religious and spiritual value of a culture is found by individuals in the setting of their own life. There can be different types of spiritual Self because it is determined by one's life and experiences."

Human beings have a Self—that is, they are able to look back on themselves as both subjects and objects in the universe. Ultimately, this brings questions about who we are and the nature of our own importance. Traditions such as Buddhism see the attachment to Self is an illusion that serves as the main cause of suffering and unhappiness. Christianity makes a distinction between the true self and the false self, and sees the false self negatively, distorted through sin: 'The heart is deceitful above all things, and desperately wicked; who can know it?' (Jeremiah 17:9)

According to Marcia Cavell, identity comes from both political and religious views. She also identified exploration and commitment as interactive parts of identity formation, which includes religious identity. Erik Erikson compared faith with doubt and found that healthy adults take heed to their spiritual side.

See also 

 Anatta— "not-self",  there is no unchanging, permanent self, soul or essence in living beings
 Ātman (Buddhism), Buddhist concept of self
 Ātman (Hinduism), inner self or soul in Hindu philosophy
 Attention
 Consciousness
 Ego (disambiguation)
 Ego death
 
 I (pronoun)
 Individual
 Individuation
 Jīva (Jainism), or Atman, used within Jainism to identify the soul
 Me (pronoun), the first-person singular pronoun, referring to the speaker
 Meditation
 Moral psychology
 Open individualism
 Outline of self
 Person (disambiguation)
 Self remembering
 Self-awareness
 Self-knowledge (psychology)
 Social projection
 Soul
 Sources of the Self
 True self and false self
 Vertiginous question
 Will (philosophy)

References

Further reading

 Anthony Elliott, Concepts of the Self
 Anthony Giddens, Modernity and self-identity: self and society in the late modern age
 Ben Morgan (2013). On Becoming God: Late Medieval Mysticism and the Modern Western Self. New York: Fordham UP
 Bernadette Roberts, What is Self?  A Research Paper
 Charalambos Tsekeris, Contextualising the self in contemporary social science
 Charles Taylor, Sources of the self: the making of the modern identity
 Clark Moustakas, The self: explorations in personal growth	
 Fernando Andacht, Mariela Michel, A Semiotic Reflection on Selfinterpretation and Identity
 Jean Dalby Clift, Core Images of the Self: A Symbolic Approach to Healing and Wholeness
 Richard Sorabji, Self: ancient and modern insights about individuality, life, and death
 Robert Kegan, The evolving self: problem and process in human development
 Thomas M. Brinthaupt, Richard P. Lipka, The Self: definitional and methodological issues
 1910-1999., Eknath, Easwaran, (2019). The Bhagavad Gita. Nilgiri Press. ISBN 1-58638-130-X. OCLC 1043425057

 
Concepts in metaphysics